Hydrobius fuscipes is a species of beetles in the family Hydrophilidae that is found across much of the temperate Northern Hemisphere.

References

Hydrophilinae
Beetles described in 1758
Taxa named by Carl Linnaeus